The Environment, Transport and Works Bureau (ETWB) was formerly a policy bureau of the Hong Kong Government in existence from 2002 to 2007. It was responsible for:

Environmental protection
Transport
Public works
Waste management

The bureau was disestablished in 2007, with its duties redistributed to the Environment Bureau, the Transport Branch of the Transport and Housing Bureau and the Works Branch of the Development Bureau.

History 
Sarah Liao held the position of Secretary for Environment, Transport and Works throughout the existence of the bureau.

References

 https://books.google.com/books?id=nWyMoEMi2uoC&pg=PA62&lpg=PA62&dq=Environment,+Transport+and+Works+Bureau+Hong+Kong&source=bl&ots=0oshXuklnN&sig=Xl6f_XoUBUeimwStE8nlMfWW1Q4&hl=en&sa=X&ei=12ALVKYQyeJo7v-BwAI&ved=0CE4Q6AEwBw#v=onepage&q=Environment%2C%20Transport%20and%20Works%20Bureau%20Hong%20Kong&f=false

Hong Kong government defunct offices
Waste organizations